Saccharopolyspora is a genus of bacteria within the family Pseudonocardiaceae.

Species
Saccharopolyspora comprises the following species:

 S. antimicrobica Yuan et al. 2008
 S. aridisoli Saygin et al. 2022
 "S. aurantiaca" Jiang and Xu 1986
 S. cavernae Cheng et al. 2014
 S. cebuensis Pimentel-Elardo et al. 2008

 S. dendranthemae Zhang et al. 2014
 S. deserti Yang et al. 2018
 S. elongata Saygin et al. 2022
 S. endophytica Qin et al. 2021
 S. erythraea (Waksman 1923) Labeda 1987
 S. flava Lu et al. 2001

 S. gloriosae Qin et al. 2010
 S. gregorii Goodfellow et al. 1989
 "S. griseoalba" Jiang et al. 2016
 S. halophila Tang et al. 2009
 S. halotolerans Lv et al. 2014
 S. hattusasensis Veyisoglu et al. 2018
 S. hirsuta Lacey and Goodfellow 1975 (Approved Lists 1980)
 S. hordei Goodfellow et al. 1989
 S. indica Vaddavalli et al. 2014

 S. karakumensis Saygin et al. 2022
 S. kobensis (Lacey 1989) Nouioui et al. 2018

 S. maritima Suksaard et al. 2018
 "S. pathumthaniensis" Sinma et al. 2011
 S. phatthalungensis Duangmal et al. 2010
 S. qijiaojingensis Tang et al. 2009
 "S. qinghaiensis" Jiang et al. 2019
 S. rectivirgula (Krassilnikov and Agre 1964) Korn-Wendisch et al. 1989
 S. rhizosphaerae Intra et al. 2019
 S. rosea Yassin 2009
 "S. salina" Suthindhiran et al. 2009
 S. shandongensis Zhang et al. 2008
 "S. soli" Veyisoglu et al. 2022
 S. spinosa Mertz and Yao 1990
 S. spinosporotrichia Zhou et al. 1998
 S. spongiae Souza et al. 2017
 S. subtropica Wu et al. 2016
 S. taberi (Labeda 1987) Korn-Wendisch et al. 1989
 S. terrae Saygin et al. 2022
 S. thermophila  Lu et al. 2001
 S. tripterygii Li et al. 2009

References

Pseudonocardineae
Bacteria genera